Nigel Henry (born May 24, 1976 in Carenage) is a retired Trinidadian soccer player.

Career

Club
In 2001 Henry was signed by the Hershey Wildcats of the USL First Division where he and his teammates reached the USL First Division Championship game. In 2002 Henry was transferred to the Montreal Impact where he played seven games. In the following season, 2003, Henry signed for the Charleston Battery where he was a solid defender, helping the team capture the USL First Division Championship.

In May 2005, Henry signed with the Toronto Lynx where he was a key contributor in the defence for a struggling team plagued with injuries throughout the season.

To improve his chances of selection for the 2006 FIFA World Cup, Henry signed that year for Kiruna FF of the Swedish Division 1, but was unsuccessful in his bid, and never played a game for the team. After another brief stint back home with the Superstar Rangers, the Puerto Rico Islanders announced the signing of Henry and Kevon Villaroel for the 2008 season. He retired at the end of the 2009 season, but in the second half of the 2010 season came back to the Islanders, from which he later retired again.

International
In 2005 Henry earned two international caps or selection for the Trinidad and Tobago, having been named in squads against Barbados and Guatemala.

Honors

Puerto Rico Islanders
USSF Division 2 Pro League Champions (1): 2010
Commissioner's Cup  Winners (1): 2008

References

External links
 Puerto Rico Islanders bio

1976 births
Living people
Trinidad and Tobago footballers
Expatriate footballers in Puerto Rico
Expatriate soccer players in Canada
Expatriate soccer players in the United States
Association football defenders
Hershey Wildcats players
Howard Bison men's soccer players
Montreal Impact (1992–2011) players
People from Diego Martin region
Puerto Rico Islanders players
Toronto Lynx players
Trinidad and Tobago expatriate footballers
Trinidad and Tobago expatriate sportspeople in Canada
Trinidad and Tobago expatriate sportspeople in the United States
Trinidad and Tobago international footballers
USL First Division players
USSF Division 2 Professional League players
Trinidad and Tobago expatriate sportspeople in Puerto Rico
TT Pro League players